Porta Genova is a station on Line 2 of the Milan Metro. It was opened on 30 October 1983 as the terminus and part of the extension of the line from Cadorna. On 3 April 1985 the line was extended to Romolo.

The station is located between Via Valenza and Via Casale, very close to the Milano Porta Genova railway station.

References

External links

Line 2 (Milan Metro) stations
Railway stations opened in 1983
1983 establishments in Italy
Railway stations in Italy opened in the 20th century